Daphnandra micrantha, the socketwood or Manning River socketwood is a rainforest tree in eastern Australia. It grows near streams in various types of rainforest. Restricted to the Manning River and Hastings River valleys (31° S) of northern eastern New South Wales. Also seen in ecotone areas dominated by brush box and tallowwood.

Naming and taxonomy 
A member of the ancient Gondwana family Atherospermataceae. Previously considered one species, it is now published as four different types of socketwood by Richard Schodde. The generic name Daphnandra refers to a similarity of the anthers of the Bay Laurel. Greek daphne refers to the Bay Laurel, and andros from the Greek for man. Micanthra from the Greek refers to small flowers. A feature of Daphnandra apatela is where larger branchlets meet the main trunk, resembling a "ball and socket" type joint. Hence the common name of socketwood for this group of trees.

Description 
A small to medium-sized tree, sometimes reaching 20 metres tall and with a trunk diameter of 25 cm. The bark is fawnish cream in colour, with vertical cracks. The small branches lack the soft downy hairs of other socketwood types. Branchlets are flattened where they join the main stem.

Leaves 
Leaves opposite on the stem. 7 to 17 cm long, 1 to 5 cm wide, finely toothed. Approximately 14 teeth per side. Midrib raised below the leaf, but sunken above. Five pairs of lateral veins, more evident below the leaf. Leaf stem 3 to 8 mm long.

Flowers and fruit 
Small flowers form from June to October, being greenish white or pinkish green. The fruit is a woody receptacle, it splits in two, releasing hairy wind blown achenes with one seed.

References

 http://plantnet.rbgsyd.nsw.gov.au/cgi-bin/NSWfl.pl?page=nswfl&lvl=sp&name=Daphnandra~micrantha access date 29 January 2010

Atherospermataceae
Trees of Australia
Flora of New South Wales